The 2008 Horizon League men's basketball tournament is scheduled at the end of the 2007–2008 regular season. The better seed will host each first round match. Butler hosted the second round and semifinals, because they were the top seed. The final was hosted by the better remaining seed.

Tiebreakers
The first tiebreaker resolved is the one between seeds 2 and 3.

Seeds 2–3
The first tiebreaker is head-to-head record.
The second tiebreaker is record against the top seed Butler.
The third tiebreaker is record against the teams tied for 4th.
Cleveland State earns the 2nd seed by virtue of its 5–3 record against UIC, Valparaiso, UW-Green Bay and UW-Milwaukee.
Wright State earns the 3rd seed because of its 4–4 record against UIC, Valparaiso, UW-Green Bay and UW-Milwaukee.

Seeds 4–7
The first tiebreaker is record against the tied teams.
UIC earns the 4th seed by virtue of a 4–2 record against Valparaiso, UW-Green Bay and UW-Milwaukee.
UW-Green Bay earns the 7th seed because of its 2–4 record against UIC, Valparaiso and UW-Milwaukee.
Since UW-Milwaukee and Valparaiso had identical 3–3 records against the other three teams, the tiebreaker between those two teams is head-to-head record.
The second tiebreaker is record against the top seed Butler.
The third tiebreaker is record against the second seed Cleveland State.
UW-Milwaukee earns the 5th seed by virtue of its 1–1 record against Cleveland State.
Valparaiso earns the 6th seed because of its 0–2 record against Cleveland State.

Bracket

First round games at campus sites of higher seeds
Second round and semifinals will be hosted by the top seed.
Championship will be hosted by lower-numbered remaining seed

External links
Horizon League Track the Bracket

References

Tournament
Horizon League men's basketball tournament
Horizon League men's basketball tournament
Horizon League men's basketball tournament